The 2007–08 Kategoria Superiore was the 72nd season of top-tier football in Albania and the tenth season under the name Kategoria Superiore. The season began on 25 August 2007 and ended on 17 May 2008. KF Tirana were the defending champions, having won their twenty-third title the previous season.

Teams

Stadia and last season

League table

Results
The schedule consisted of three rounds. During the first two rounds, each team played each other once home and away for a total of 22 matches. The pairings of the third round were then set according to the standings after the first two rounds, giving every team a third game against each opponent for a total of 33 games per team.

First and second round

Third round

Relegation playoffs

Season statistics

Top scorers
Source: FootballDatabase.eu

Notes

External links
 Albsoccer.com
 Albanian Superliga on UEFA website

Kategoria Superiore seasons
Albanian Superliga
1